The Irish Poker Open  is the longest running No Limit Texas hold 'em poker tournament in Europe and second longest in the world after the World Series of Poker.

First organised in 1980 by Terry Rogers, a well known Irish bookmaker, the tournament is Europe's largest and a fixture on the international poker calendar. It is traditionally held over Easter weekend each year.

After Terry Rogers death in 1999 the tournament, originally held in Dublin's Eccentric Club, was subsequently hosted by tournament director and poker player Liam Flood and the Merrion Casino.

paddypowerpoker.com began sponsorship of the event in 2005 and oversaw the huge growth in the tournament. By 2006 the event, with 339 players, had outgrown the Merrion Casino and was held in Jury's Ballsbridge Hotel in Dublin. In 2007 the venue was changed to the Burlington Hotel, Dublin to accommodate the bigger field, while in 2008 and 2009 the Irish Open venue was Citywest Hotel, Dublin.  In 2010 the tournament returned to the Burlington Hotel and numbers declined year on year up to 2015 which was inline with trends and decline in the online poker industry.

In 2016, the Irish Poker Open returned to Citywest Hotel for a week long festival from 21 to 28 March, culminating in the €500k Main Event. The 2016 Irish Poker Open was managed by JP Poker and Countside Ltd, both companies have organised tournaments in both Ireland and Europe for the last 20 years.

Due to the ongoing COVID-19 pandemic, the 2020 Irish Poker Open is being staged online.

Origins

Terry Rogers once declared "I have been the greatest single factor in the worldwide spread of competitive poker."

One of his most enduring legacies was founding the Irish Open. In the late 1970s Terry started to hold poker tournaments for charity under the auspices of the Eccentric Club. According to Liam Flood, a fellow bookmaker and friend of Terry's the games would get "anywhere between 100 and 300 players playing five-card draw for £100 to £200 per game. That was a lot of people for that kind of money at the time. Every year Terry would go to America on business. In May 1979 he had a few days off and went to Las Vegas. He saw this high stakes poker game going on and met Benny Binion and the rest is history."

Always one to spot an opportunity Rogers cemented his relationship with Binion and his band of high-rolling players by taking bets from them on the outcome of the games, offering the type of long odds the Americans had never seen before.

"Guys like Benny Binion, Doyle Brunson and Chip Reese really held Terry in high esteem," states World Series of Poker bracelet winner and former Irish Olympic swimmer Donnacha O'Dea. "He'd give them great odds, better than any American bookie would give, but he still made sure he had a 20% edge."

After the 1979 World Series Terry returned to Ireland enthused about what he'd seen. Stud and draw were the poker variants of choice in Ireland but the new variation he'd seen in Vegas, no-limit hold'em, beat them all for excitement and skill.

In the following years he returned to Vegas for the World Series with Liam Flood but his bookmaking activities brought the attention of the Las Vegas Police Department and on one occasion Terry and Liam ended up being arrested and imprisoned. The irony of being jailed for gambling in Vegas was not lost on them according to Flood.

Development
The Irish Open was organised under the auspices of the charity fundraising organisation started by Terry called the Eccentric Club. It attracted mainly local players but Rogers already had his eye on expanding the event.

Donnacha O'Dea remembers the stunts Rogers pulled to generate interest in the Irish Open. "He'd publicise betting on the tournament in the Racing Post along with an event such as the Super Bowl so he could get around the law on advertising such events. He'd install an outsider such as 'Suitcase' Johnny as favourite. Poker players would then see these odds and think to themselves, 'Well I'm much better than this guy who's favourite' and immediately want to take part in the tournament."

The Irish Open fell into abeyance in the early 1990s as Terry concentrated on nursing his mother through ill health. It was resurrected again in the mid-1990s.

Relationship with the World Series of Poker
Terry's annual trips to Las Vegas and the success of the first Irish Open led to the US players he had befriended at the World Series of Poker repaying their debt of gratitude for his generous bookmaking services by making a rare excursion from their home soil to play in Ireland in 1982 and 1983.

Donnacha and Liam remember the American invasions with glee. "One year Terry got them a yellow Rolls-Royce for when they arrived at the airport. Another year he arrived with a white horse which Amarillo Slim, who was a real horseman, rode out of the airport.

"Those years he had Tom McEvoy, Jack Keller, Stu Ungar, Doyle Brunson, Chip Reese, and Perry Green from Alaska. It was funny to see them try to pay for goods in Killiney village with chips from Terry's poker tournament, something they were used to doing in Vegas."

Irish Open 2007
The Irish Poker Open 2007 Main Event had a guaranteed prize pool of €2 million – twice the €1 million guarantee of 2006 but with a then-European record 708 players the prize pool swelled to more than €2.3 million.

The final table of six was made up of four Irishmen, an Englishman and a Canadian. The winner, Belfast man Marty Smyth, took home the €650,000 first prize after a two-hour heads-up battle against World Poker Tour and European Poker Tour winner Roland De Wolfe. Successful online player Sorel Mizzi from Toronto finished third ahead of Irishmen Danny McHugh (4th), Brian O'Keeffe (5th) and Nicky Power (6th).

Irish Open 2008
The Irish Poker Open 2008 was held at Citywest Hotel, Dublin and a field of 667 took part in the main event.  Notable players included poker legend Doyle Brunson, his son Todd Brunson, Sorel Mizzi, Roland De Wolfe, Padraig Parkinson, World Series of Poker bracelet-winner Ciaran O'Leary, Dario Minieri and dozens of other poker professionals.  Paddy Power Poker added €200,000 to the prize pool, which took it past the €3 million mark.

English poker pro Neil Channing won €801,400 and the Irish Open title after defeating local favourite Donal Norton of Tipperary heads up. Norton took home €420,000 for his 2nd-place finish.  Thomas Dunwoodie finished in 3rd place ahead of Tim Blake (4th), Kai Danilo Paulsen (5th) and Edwin Tournier (6th). Channing added £50,000 to his winnings by putting a £500 bet on himself at 100/1 with Paddy Power at the midpoint of the four-day tournament.

Irish Open 2009
The Irish Open 2009 returned to Citywest Hotel, Dublin, the venue for the 2008 Irish Open.  A larger-than-expected field of 700 played in the main event, including famous faces such as Phil Laak, Jennifer Tilly, Neil Channing, Marty Smyth, Andy Black, Jamie Gold, Dan Harrington, Juha Helppi, Roland De Wolfe and Ciaran O'Leary.

Swedish poker professional Christer Johansson won the title and €600,000, with Kara Scott finishing in second place for €312,600.

Irish Open 2010
The Irish Open 2010 returned to Burlington Hotel, Dublin, where the Irish Open had been hosted three years previously. A field of 708 played in the main event, including such celebrities as Irish soccer hero Tony Cascarino, former Manchester United star Teddy Sheringham, rugby legend Reggie Corrigan and former snooker world champion Ken Doherty. Many well-known poker players took part, including Padraig Parkinson, Liam Flood, Sandra Naujoks, Dario Minieri, Neil Channing, Marty Smyth and former World Series of Poker champions Noel Furlong and Dan Harrington.

Twenty-year-old Englishman James Mitchell won the title and €600,000 first prize, with Paul Carr from Limerick finishing in second place for €312,600.  Rob Sherwood become the €100,000 Sole Survivor by outlasting all other paddypowerpoker.com qualifiers; he won an additional €163,300 for finishing in fourth position.

Irish Open 2011
The 2011 Irish Open Main Event was won by Irishman Niall Smyth who won a €550,000 first prize. He beat experienced Englishman Surinder Sunar heads up. Sunar received €290,000 for his second-place finish.

Irish Open 2012
The 2012 Irish Open Main Event was won by Belgian professional Kevin Vandersmissen, who won €420,000 for first prize. Vandersmissen beat German player Thomas Beer in heads up to take first place.

Irish Open 2013
The 2013 Irish Open Main event saw the past year's fourth-place finisher, Ian Simpson, take first place, and a prize of €265,000. The noticeably smaller first place payout was due to the buy in for this year's event being dropped from €3,500 to €2,250. Following his win Simpson proposed to his girlfriend.

Irish Open 2022
Following the lifting of government imposed Covid restrictions in Ireland, the tournament organizers announced that the 2022 Irish Poker Open will take place at the Citywest Hotel in Dublin, between April 11th and April 18th 2022.

Past winners

2020s
2022 Steve O'Dwyer
2021 Pavel Veksler (online event due COVID-19 pandemic)
2020 Pablo Silva (online event due COVID-19 pandemic)

2010s
2019 Weijie "Jervi" Zheng
2018 Ryan Mandara
2017 Griffin Benger
2016 Dan Wilson
2015 Ioannis Triantafyllakis
2014 Patrick Clarke
2013 Ian Simpson
2012 Kevin Vandersmissen
2011 Niall Smyth
2010 James Mitchell

2000s
2009 Christer Johansson
2008 Neil Channing
2007 Marty Smyth
2006 Vincent Melinn
2005 John Falconer
2004 Ivan Donaghy
2003 Joe Beevers
2002 Nick Bernie
2001 Jenny Hegarty
2000 Alan Betson

1990s
1999 Liam Barker
1998 Mickey Finn
1996 Liam Flood
1994 Mickey Finn
1993 Christie Smith
1991 Colette Doherty
1990 Liam Flood

1980s
1989 Noel Furlong
1988 Jimmy Langan
1987 Noel Furlong
1986 Bryan McCarthy
1985 Irene Tier
1984 Tony Byrne
1983 Jimmy Langan
1982 Frank Conway
1981 Sean Kelly
1980 Colette Doherty

References

External links
Official site
Origin of Irish Poker Open

Poker tournaments in Europe
Recurring events established in 1980
1980 establishments in Ireland